Deudorix dinochares, the apricot playboy, is a butterfly of the family Lycaenidae. It is found in South Africa, Madagascar, Zimbabwe, eastern Africa and south-west Arabia. In South Africa it is found from northern KwaZulu-Natal to Eswatini, Mpumalanga, Limpopo, North West and Gauteng.

The wingspan is 24–30 mm for males and 26–32 mm for females. Adults are on the wing year-round with peaks from September to October and from March to May.

The larvae feed on the fruit of a wide range of plants such as: Combretum species (including C. zeyheri), Burkea species (including B. africana), Syzygium species (including S. cordatum), Gardenia species (including G. volkensii and G. neuberia), Pseudolachnostylis maprouneifolia, Acacia species (including A. stenocarpa), Dolichos, Lablab, Schotea, Macadamia, Coffea, Quisqualis, Schotia, Tamarindus, Vigna, Psidium, Prunus and Ximenia species.

References

External links

Die Gross-Schmetterlinge der Erde 13: Die Afrikanischen Tagfalter. Plate XIII 66 d

Butterflies described in 1887
Butterflies of Africa
Taxa named by Henley Grose-Smith
Deudorix